Marek Pisula (born 6 February 1969) is a Polish judoka. He competed in the men's middleweight event at the 1996 Summer Olympics.

Achievements

References

External links

1969 births
Living people
Polish male judoka
Sportspeople from Wrocław
Olympic judoka of Poland
Judoka at the 1996 Summer Olympics